Calloporidae is a family of bryozoans belonging to the order Cheilostomatida.

Genera

Genera:
 Acanthoporella Davis, 1934
 Acanthoporidra Davis, 1934
 Adenifera Canu & Bassler, 1917

References

Bryozoan families